Dieter Urbach (born 2 February 1935) is a German athlete. He competed in the men's shot put at the 1960 Summer Olympics.

References

1935 births
Living people
Athletes (track and field) at the 1960 Summer Olympics
German male shot putters
Olympic athletes of the United Team of Germany
Place of birth missing (living people)
Universiade silver medalists for West Germany
Universiade bronze medalists for West Germany
Universiade medalists in athletics (track and field)
Medalists at the 1961 Summer Universiade